The Waiter Minute EP is the debut extended play by Australian musician Seth Sentry. Released in 2008, the EP was certified platinum in Australia in 2020.

Track listing
 "Simple Game"	
 "The Waitress Song"	
 "Warm Winter"	
 "Train Catcher"	
 "Strange Lot"

Certifications

Release history

References

2008 debut EPs
Seth Sentry EPs